A Love for Dilemma (lit. A Little Dilemma) is a 2021 Chinese television series based on Lu Yingong's novel of the same name, directed by Zhang Xiaobo and starring Song Jia, Tong Dawei, Jiang Xin, Li Jiahang and Zhang Guoli. The series follows the story of the three-generation parent-child relationship and family education of the two families of Nan Li and Tian Yulan as clues. It airs on Dragon Television, CCTV-8 and IQIYI starting April 11, 2021.

Plots
The story revolves around Nan Li (Xiao Song Jia), Xia Junshan (Tong Dawei) and their daughter Xia Huanhuan, son Xia Chaochao and Tian Yulan (Jiang Xin), Yan Peng (Li Jiahang) and son Yan Ziyou and other families. The children are about to move from primary school to junior high school. Every family is facing various changes. The parent-child relationship is also gaining new understanding through constant communication and choices. Parents and children will usher in the growth together.

Cast
Xiao Song Jia as Nan Li
Luan Xizias Nan Li (young) 
Tong Dawei as Xia Junshan 
Jiang Xin as Tian Yulan
Li Jiahang as Yan Peng
Zhang Guoli as Nan Jianlong
Wu Yue as Assistant Team Leader Li 
Wu Yufang as Cai Juying 
Zhu Yin as Aunt Zhao 
Liu Chutian as Xia Huanhuan
Wu Ze Jinxi as Yan Ziyou 
Shan Yuhao as Xia Chaochao 
Li Yiqian as Mi Tao
Jia Shunzhi as Mi Tao's father
Liu Shan as Mi Tao's mother 
Zhang Tao as Teacher Zhong
Li Henan as Zhang Xue'er
Fu Chong as Father Yan
Zhu Yaying as Mother Yan
Zhou Dehua as Fang Yuanyang
Wang Zijian as Manager Cui 
Wu Chao as Manager Wei 
Zhang Lu as CEO Fu Nuan
Pu Shiyun as Lu Lu 
Bu Guanjin as Qi Qi
Fan Shuaiqi as Fei Fei
Li Xiaoyan as Mother Xia
Liu Zhiyun as Lao Zhang
Li Zhiqiang as Chief Lin
Cao Yi as Vice Principal He
Huang Xiaolin as Fei Xiaona
Wang Shanshui as Chen Yong
Lu Zhong as Principal Ya De
Zheng Xiaowan as Teacher Lu
Zhu Guoyu as Chief Wang
Chen Qi as Architecturer
Mei Nianjia as Tuo Ni 
Wang Xiaomi as Zhao Lin 
Zou Chenlei as Xu Yijia 
Xu Yutong as Girl 
He Qingyao as Man Man 
Yang Zijie as Wang Xian
Mao Dou as Xiao Pang

Ratings 

 Highest ratings are marked in red, lowest ratings are marked in blue

References

External links 
 
 

2021 Chinese television series debuts
2021 Chinese television series endings
Chinese television series
Chinese drama television series
China Central Television original programming
Dragon Television original programming
Television series by Linmon Pictures
IQIYI original programming
Television series based on novels
Mandarin-language television shows